Thomas of Edessa (or Tōmā ūrhāyā; died c. 540) was a theologian of the Church of the East who wrote several works in Syriac, most of them lost.

Thomas was educated in Edessa. There he taught Greek to the future patriarch, Aba. He later travelled with Aba around the Roman Empire, including to its capital, Constantinople. He studied under Aba at the school of Nisibis in the Persian Empire. He also taught at Nisibis. He may have died in Constantinople or on his return journey to Nisibis.

Thomas was influenced by the theology of Theodore of Mopsuestia. He wrote several works, but only two survive and only one of these has been printed. ʿAbdishoʿ bar Brikha ascribes to him some buyyāye (hortatory discourses), a refutation of astrology, some treatises against heresy in the form of disputations and an epistolary treatise on qāle, that is, stanzaic syllabic chants. His commentaries on the feasts of Nativity and Epiphany are the oldest extant examples in the genre of ʿelta (cause, explanation, etiology). Only his explanation of the Nativity has been printed. Cyrus of Edessa continued the work of Thomas by writing etiologies for the spring festivals.

Editions
Reprinted as Thomas of Edessa on the Nativity of the Lord. the Syriac Studies Library, 79. Gorgias Press, 2012.

Notes

Bibliography

6th-century Christian theologians
Church of the East writers
Syriac Christians
Syriac writers
Christians in the Sasanian Empire